Boniface Benzinge is the Rwandan chief of the Abiru, hereditary privy councillors to the Mwami of Rwanda.

Life
A member of a family of royal historians, Benzinge was a courtier to King Kigeli V, who was the last reigning king of his country before being deposed in 1961.

Following that event, Benzinge and his fellow Abiru announced his nephew as Kigeli's titular successor. Although a faction of the royal family opposed this act, the new king was nevertheless subsequently crowned as Yuhi VI in 2017.

Since this occurred, Benzinge has continued to serve as the head of the royal court.

See also
 Abiru

References

Rwandan monarchy
Rwandan historians
Rwandan poets
African traditional governments
Living people
Date of birth missing (living people)
Place of birth missing (living people)
Year of birth missing (living people)